Louis Nicholas Vasquez  (born April 11, 1987) is a former American football guard. He played college football at Texas Tech, and was drafted by the San Diego Chargers in the third round of the 2009 NFL Draft.

Early life
Vasquez is of Mexican American descent. He attended Corsicana High School in Corsicana, Texas, a rural town located approx. 60 miles southeast of Dallas.

College career

College awards and honors
2007 All-Big 12 honorable mention
2008 All-Big 12 second-team
2008 Rivals.com second-team All-American
2008 Associated Press third-team All-American

Professional career

San Diego Chargers
At the 2009 NFL Combine, Vasquez bench pressed 225 pounds 39 times. His 39 repetitions were the highest of any participant at the combine. Vasquez was drafted in the 3rd round (78th overall) by the San Diego Chargers.

During the Chargers' training camp, Vasquez competed for the right guard starting position with veteran Kynan Forney. Vasquez won the job, and Forney (who was dealing with a neck injury at the time) was later released from the team. Vasquez became the sole rookie in the starting lineup. he remained at right guard during his tenure with San Diego

Denver Broncos
Vasquez signed a four-year contract with the Denver Broncos on March 12, 2013.

Vasquez was selected to be in the 2014 Pro Bowl after not allowing a single sack in 2013. He could not play due to the Broncos’ appearance in Super Bowl XLVIII. On February 7, 2016, Vasquez was part of the Broncos team that won Super Bowl 50. In the game, the Broncos defeated the Carolina Panthers by a score of 24–10.

Vasquez was released by the team on March 8, 2016.

After Vasquez's release, The Denver Post published a story that explained, "Vasquez, 28, was the Broncos' starter at right guard for the past three seasons. He was released to save the team salary cap space. The Broncos did not approach him about restructuring his contract. Vasquez was an all-pro in 2013, but over the past two seasons, struggled with nagging injuries and shifting positions. His power blocking prowess was not a great fit in Broncos coach Gary Kubiak's zone blocking scheme."

References

External links
Denver Broncos bio 
San Diego Chargers bio 
Texas Tech Red Raiders bio

1987 births
Living people
People from Corsicana, Texas
American football offensive guards
American football offensive tackles
Texas Tech Red Raiders football players
San Diego Chargers players
Denver Broncos players
Unconferenced Pro Bowl players
American sportspeople of Mexican descent
Players of American football from Texas